The Furnished Houses (Rent Control) Act 1946 was an Act of the Parliament of the United Kingdom that and set up rent tribunals to control rents in the private sector. and regulated renting prices. Following the Second World War, the practice of limiting rent prices had been introduced due to the scarcity of rented property, which made it a "seller's market".

The Act was intended to stop the high prices in furnished properties being rented out; as they were furnished, they were not covered by previous Rent Acts. It was given royal assent on 26 March 1946. The Act was heavily influenced by the Ridley Committee, established to investigate rent control methods, which reported in 1945.

The Act set up rent assessment committees, which were given to districts after a consultation with the Minister of Health or his representative. Upon these tribunals being established in a district, they set a fixed maximum of rent for furnished dwellings, making it illegal for the landlord to charge more. The tribunals were criticised for their slow pace and for failing to charge landlords for previous exorbitant rent prices, and the Act was repealed by Section 117 of the Rent Act 1968.

See also
English land law
Rent regulation

Notes

References
 
 
 

United Kingdom Acts of Parliament 1946
Repealed United Kingdom Acts of Parliament
Britain
English land law
Regulation in the United Kingdom